Horace Seely-Brown Jr. (May 12, 1908 – April 9, 1982) was an American politician and a US Representative from Connecticut.

Biography
Seely-Brown was born in Kensington, Maryland.  He attended the Hoosac School in Hoosick, New York, and graduated from Hamilton College in Clinton, New York, in 1929.  He was a graduate student at Yale University in 1929 and 1930. He married Rosalie Hicks and they had two daughters, Rosalie Seely-Brown Parker, and Constance Seelly-Brown McClellan as well as a son, Horace Seely-Brown III.

Career
Seely-Brown was a school teacher in Hoosick from 1930 to 1932, and in New Lebanon, New York, from 1932 to 1934. In 1934, he moved to Pomfret, Connecticut, where he taught, coached, and served as a dorm parent at Pomfret School until 1942. He was a delegate to the Republican state conventions in 1938, 1940, and 1942.

During World War II, Seely-Brown served in the United States Navy as air operations officer, Carrier Aircraft Service Unit No. 2, from February 1943 to January 1946.  After the war he engaged in agricultural pursuits.

Elected as a Republican to the Eightieth Congress Seely-Brown served from January 3, 1947, to January 3, 1949, and was an unsuccessful candidate for reelection in 1948 to the Eighty-first Congress. He was elected to the Eighty-second and to the three succeeding Congresses, and served from January 3, 1951 to January 3, 1959 before becoming an unsuccessful candidate for reelection in 1958 to the Eighty-sixth Congress. Seely-Brown voted in favor of the Civil Rights Act of 1957, but voted present on the 24th Amendment to the U.S. Constitution. He was elected in 1960 to the Eighty-seventh Congress and served from January 3, 1961 to January 3, 1963.  In 1962 he was the Republican candidate for the US Senate seat of retiring Republican Prescott Bush and was defeated in a close race with the Democratic former governor, Abraham Ribicoff, receiving 48% of the vote. After political office, he resumed agricultural pursuits and resided in Pomfret Center, Connecticut.

Death
Seely-Brown died in Boca Raton, Palm Beach County, Florida, at his winter home, on April 9, 1982 (age 73 years, 332 days). He is interred at Christ Episcopal Church Cemetery, Pomfret Center, Pomfret, Connecticut.

References

External links
 
 
The New York Times Company

1908 births
1982 deaths
People from Kensington, Maryland
Hamilton College (New York) alumni
People from Pomfret, Connecticut
Yale University alumni
United States Navy personnel of World War II
Republican Party members of the United States House of Representatives from Connecticut
People from New Lebanon, New York
20th-century American politicians
United States Navy officers